Donald R. Cronin was a Michigan mayor and politician.

Political life
The Flint City Commission selected Cronin as mayor for the years 1968-70.

References

Mayors of Flint, Michigan
Year of birth missing
2006 deaths
20th-century American politicians